Hydrurales is an order of golden algae.

References

Chrysophyceae
Heterokont orders